Andre-Michel Schub (born 26 December 1952, in Paris) is a classical pianist.

Biography
Schub came to New York City with his family, when he was eight months old. He began his piano studies with his mother when he was four, and later continued his work with Jascha Zayde. He graduated from Midwood High School in Brooklyn, New York, and attended Princeton University, and then transferred to the Curtis Institute of Music, where he studied with Rudolf Serkin, from 1970 to 1973.  He judged the 1997 Hilton Head Competition.

He has taught at the Manhattan School of Music, since 2006.

Prizes
In 1974 Schub took first prize at the Naumburg Competition. In 1977 he received the Avery Fisher Prize. In 1981 he won the Gold medal at the  Van Cliburn International Competition

Concert career
His New York debut at Alice Tully Hall on May 13, 1974, was reviewed by The New York Times as an "impressive debut".  In 1979, he became the pianist for the New York Chamber Music Society.  
Schub appears frequently as guest artist with Mostly Mozart, Tanglewood, Ravinia, and Blossom festivals.  He has performed with major orchestras, including the Boston, Chicago, Cincinnati, Dallas, Detroit, St. Louis and Cleveland and Philadelphia symphony orchestras and the Los Angeles and New York philharmonics and the Royal Concertgebouw.  He is an artist of The Chamber Music Society of Lincoln Center.  Since 1997, he has been music director of the Virginia Arts Festival Chamber Music Series.

On Independence Day 1986, in the PBS-televised program "A Capitol Fourth, 1986," he performed Piano Concerto No. 1 (Tchaikovsky) with the National Symphony Orchestra, conducted by Mstislav Rostropovich.

He has performed on Saint Paul Sunday, and Performance Today.

Most recently, on May 19, 2006, he gave the world premier performance  of Bright Sheng's "Three Fantasies for Violin and Piano," commissioned by the McKim Fund in the Library of Congress.

Recordings

 Beethoven: Piano Sonatas Nos. 3 & 23 ("Appassionata"), Vox (Classical), ASIN: B00008FZYM (November 4, 1992)
 Bright Sheng: 3 Fantasies: No. 3. Kazakhstan Love Song, Naxos, ASIN: B001P2C34I, January 27, 2009
 Van Cliburn Competition 1981, Video Artists Int'l, ASIN: B00000I7H7, November 30, 1999
 Asia: Concerto For Piano, Koch Int'l Classics, ASIN: B000001SJK, November 18, 1997
 A Mozart Celebration: Virginia Arts Festival, Musical Heritage Society, ASIN: B000KLVS50
 Stravinsky: Suite Italienne/Duo Concertant/Divertimento, Sony, ASIN: B0000026EE, October 25, 1990
 Brahms: Variations and Fugue on a Theme by Handel, Op. 24, Liszt: Grande Etudes de Paganini (No. 2 in E-flat and No. 6 in A minor), Dante Sonata, Vox Cum Laude, ASIN: B001OF7NOG,
 The American Album, Rca Victor Red Seal, Catalog #68114 
 Rorem: Winter Pages, Bright Music, New World Records, Catalog #80416 
 Ludwig van Beethoven: Sonata No. 23 in F Minor, Opus 57 and Sonata No. 3 in C Major Opus 2, Vox Cum Laude, D-VCS 9062 (1984)
 Plays Schubert "Wanderer Fantasy," Chopin Fantasy in F minor, Op. 49, Mendelssohn Fantasy in F-sharp minor, Op.28. [LP] Cum Laude (Moss Music Group) D-VCL 9075 (1982)

MP3 Downloads
 Bright Sheng: 3 Fantasies: No. 1. Dreams Song
 Bright Sheng: 3 Fantasies: No. 2. Tibetan Air

DVD
 Sixth Van Cliburn International Piano Competition - Andre-Michel Schub, Panayis Lyras, Santiago Rodriguez, HARMONIA MUNDI, Part#4504

References

1952 births
Living people
American classical pianists
Male classical pianists
American male pianists
French emigrants to the United States
Curtis Institute of Music alumni
Manhattan School of Music faculty
Piano pedagogues
Prize-winners of the Van Cliburn International Piano Competition
20th-century American pianists
21st-century classical pianists
20th-century American male musicians
21st-century American male musicians
21st-century American pianists